Simone Velzeboer (born 15 April 1967) is a Dutch short track speed skater. She competed in two events at the 1992 Winter Olympics.

References

1967 births
Living people
Dutch female short track speed skaters
Olympic short track speed skaters of the Netherlands
Short track speed skaters at the 1992 Winter Olympics
Sportspeople from South Holland